Kului may refer to:
 Nototrichium, a genus of flowering plants in the family Amaranthaceae, members of which are known as kuluī in Hawaiian
 Kului language, a language in northern India